The Conspiracy of Silence is a 1995 television documentary that outlines the problem of domestic violence in the United States, and describes some solutions. The title refers to an unspoken pact in an abusive relationship, in which the abuser expects the victim never to disclose the abuse, and the abused complies in the hope of avoiding further violence. The documentary is presented by Kathleen Turner, with appearances by Denise Brown (sister of Nicole Brown Simpson), Southampton judge Deborah Kooperstein, and others.

Neal Marshad and Donna Olson, who co-wrote and co-directed the film, sought to show that domestic violence is not limited to one culture or social class, and that there is no standard profile for an abuser or an abused person. To this end, they focus on The Retreat, a women's shelter in affluent East Hampton, New York that helps battered women and their children obtain safe shelter and counselling.

The US Public Broadcasting Service (PBS) broadcast The Conspiracy of Silence three times between 1995 and 1996. The film won a Silver Award in the Women's Issues category at WorldFest-Houston in 1996, and an Honorable Mention at the 1996 Columbus International Film & Video Festival, in the Health & Medicine category.

See also
 Domestic Violence Documentaries
 Defending Our Lives (1993), a short American documentary about battered women who are in prison for killing their abusers
 Power and Control: Domestic Violence in America (2010), a documentary about domestic violence and the community-based Duluth Model to reduce domestic violence
 Silent Voices (2005), a British docudrama based on more than 100 interviews conducted by the writer
 Sin by Silence (2009), a US documentary about women who killed their abusive husbands

References

External links
 
 

1995 films
American documentary films
Documentary films about violence against women
1995 documentary films
Violence against women in the United States
1990s English-language films
1990s American films